Noga Nir-Kistler (born May 18, 1979) is an Israeli born American Paralympic swimmer and table tennis player who won 2 silver medals at the 2007 Parapan American Games for table tennis singles and doubles. She also won a bronze medal in  breaststroke at 2012 Summer Paralympics in London.

References

Living people
1979 births
Paralympic swimmers of the United States
Paralympic bronze medalists for the United States
Swimmers at the 2012 Summer Paralympics
American female breaststroke swimmers
Medalists at the 2012 Summer Paralympics
American sportswomen
S6-classified Paralympic swimmers
Medalists at the World Para Swimming Championships
Paralympic medalists in swimming
Medalists at the 2007 Parapan American Games
21st-century American women